The 2021 Georgia Bulldogs football team represented the University of Georgia in the 2021 NCAA Division I FBS football season. The Bulldogs played their home games at Sanford Stadium in Athens, Georgia, and competed in the Eastern Division of the Southeastern Conference (SEC). They were led by sixth-year head coach Kirby Smart. They finished the season with 14 wins and 1 loss (14–1 overall, 8–0 in the SEC). Georgia won the National Championship and was the consensus No. 1 team at the conclusion of the season. The 14 games won by the Bulldogs also set the record for the most wins in a single season in school history until it was broken  the following season, where Georgia finished with a 15-0 record. 

This season is one of two back-to-back Georgia seasons that won a national championship. In the 2021 season, Georgia won 33-17 against Alabama, and in the 2022 season, Georgia won 65-7 against TCU.

The Bulldogs made it to the College Football Playoff for the first time since 2017. After defeating Michigan in the semifinals, they defeated Alabama to win their first national championship since 1980. This was the first time a No. 3 team has won the CFP National Championship. It also marked the first time in the history of college football, since the Associated Press poll began in 1936, that a college football team had won an AP National Championship after losing their respective conference championship game in the same season.

Some experts have viewed the 2021 Bulldogs as having one of the greatest defenses in college football history.

Previous season 
Georgia finished the previous season with a record of 8–2 (7–2 in the SEC) and a Peach Bowl victory. After a Sugar Bowl Victory in the 2019 campaign, Georgia was predicted to be the runner up to Florida in the Eastern Division. Georgia finished the regular season with a 7-2 record. Georgia was ranked No. 9 in the College Football Playoff(CFP) standings and they were chosen to play the No. 8 Cincinnati Bearcats in the 2021 Peach Bowl. The Bulldogs would win the game 24-21. After the victory, Georgia finished with a final ranking of No. 7 in both the AP and Coaches' Polls.

Offseason

SEC Media Days

Preseason All-SEC teams
The Bulldogs had eleven players selected to the preseason all-SEC teams.

Offense

2nd team

JT Daniels – QB

Zamir White - RB

George Pickens - WR

Jamaree Salyer – OL

3rd team

Jermaine Burton – WR

Defense

1st team

Jordan Davis – DL

3rd team

Travon Walker – DL

Nakobe Dean – LB

Lewis Cine - DB

Specialists

1st team

Jake Camarda – P

3rd team

Kearis Jackson - RS

Transfers 

Outgoing

The Bulldogs lost 13 players via transfer from the 2020 season. They gained 3 players for the 2021 season. 

Incoming

Roster

Schedule

Spring game 
The Bulldogs held the Georgia football spring game, "G-Day", on April 17. The Red Team beat the Black Team 28-23 Due to COVID-19 the games capacity was limited to just over 20,000 fans.

Regular season 
Georgia announced its 2021 schedule on January 27, 2021. It consisted of six home games, four away games, and two neutral site games. The Bulldogs hosted SEC foes Arkansas, Kentucky, Missouri, and South Carolina. The Bulldogs traveled to face Auburn, Tennessee, and Vanderbilt. Georgia played Florida in Jacksonville, Florida. 

Georgia's out of conference opponents represented the ACC, C-USA and Big South. The Bulldogs played four non-conference games which were against UAB from the Conference USA, Charleston Southern from the Big South, Georgia Tech from the ACC, and Clemson from the ACC in Charlotte, North Carolina in the Duke's Mayo Classic.

Coaching staff

Analysts

Will Muschamp

Game summaries

vs No. 3 Clemson

vs UAB

vs South Carolina

vs Vanderbilt

vs No. 8 Arkansas

vs No. 18 Auburn

vs No. 11 Kentucky

vs Florida

vs Missouri

vs Tennessee

vs Charleston Southern

vs Georgia Tech

vs. No. 3 Alabama

vs No. 2 Michigan 
.

vs No. 1 Alabama

Rankings

Statistics

Scoring

Scoring by quarter (non-conference opponents)

Scoring by quarter (SEC opponents)

Scoring by quarter (All opponents)

Awards and honors 
Jordan Davis

 Bednarik Award
 Outland Trophy

Nakobe Dean

 Butkus Award

Coaches 
Kirby Smart

 SEC Coach of the Year

All-SEC

First Team 
TE- Brock Bowers

DT- Jordan Davis

LB- Nakobe Dean

Second Team 
OL- Jamaree Salyer

OL- Justin Shaffer

DT- Devonte Wyatt (AP: 2, Coaches: 1)

DT- Jalen Carter

LB- Channing Tindall

DB- Lewis Cine (AP: 1, Coaches: 2)

DB- Derion Kendrick

P- Jake Camarda (AP: 2, Coaches: 1)

Players in the NFL Draft

References

Georgia
Georgia Bulldogs football seasons
College Football Playoff National Champions
Orange Bowl champion seasons
Georgia Bulldogs football